Henri Jules Célestin Louette (6 September 1900 – 9 January 1985) was a Belgian ice hockey player. He competed in the men's tournament at the 1924 Winter Olympics. Louette was born in Rance, Belgium, but grew up in Chambly-Vercheres, Quebec.

References

External links
 

1900 births
1985 deaths
Ice hockey players at the 1924 Winter Olympics
Olympic ice hockey players of Belgium
People from Chambly, Quebec
Sportspeople from Hainaut (province)
Belgian ice hockey centres
Ice hockey people from Quebec